Some market segments are referred to by acronyms and initials:

List of abbreviations for market segments

Customer segments
DINKY – Double income no kids 
SOHO – Small office, home office
VSB – Very small business
SMB – Small medium business / SME – Small and medium enterprise
VALS – Values attitude and life-styles
LOHAS – Lifestyles of health and sustainability
LOVOS – Lifestyle of voluntary simplicity
OINKY - One income no kids yet
SAM – Segmented addressable market
VLE – Very large enterprise
Kippers- ((kids in parents pockets eroding retirement savings))

Market/product segments
BPO – Business process outsourcing
Comms – Communications sector
DIY – Do It yourself market
FMCG – Fast-moving consumer goods
FSS – Financial services sector
HoReCa – Hotel, restaurant, café
H&LS – Health and life sciences
ICT – Information & communication technology
RPO – Recruitment process outsourcing
ECS - Engineering and Construction Services

References

Market segmentation
Business terms
Market segments